Elvis Zaring Peacock (born November 7, 1956) is a former National Football League running back for the Los Angeles Rams from 1978 through 1980.

One of the fastest big backs of the 1970s college football scene, Peacock clocked a 9.4 second 100-yard dash while weighing 212 pounds and still in high school.  This compared to the then world record of 9.1.

References

1956 births
Living people
Players of American football from Miami
American football running backs
Oklahoma Sooners football players
Los Angeles Rams players
Cincinnati Bengals players
Miami Central Senior High School alumni